The 2010 Corsica Football Cup was a Non-FIFA football competition hosted by independent national team Corsica, the matches was played at AC Ajaccio's ground Stade François Coty and SC Bastia ground Stade Armand Cesari, four teams played, Gabon, Togo, Brittany and Corsica.

On 21 May 2010, Corsica won the "Corsica Football Cup" at Penalty shoot-out against Gabon with the score of (1 – 1, pen. 5 – 4)

Participants 
  Corsica
  Brittany
  Gabon
  Togo

Results

Semifinals

Third place match

Final

Statistics

Goalscorers

External links 
 Corsica Football Cup 2010 on RSSSF Archive

Non-FIFA football competitions
2010
2009–10 in French football
2010 in African football
Football in Corsica